Oxycrates is a genus of moths in the family Oecophoridae. The species of this genus are found on the Indian Ocean islands of the Seychelles, Mauritius and Réunion.

Species
Oxycrates fulvoradiella Legrand, 1966
Oxycrates longodivisella Legrand, 1966
Oxycrates reunionella Guillermet, 2011
Oxycrates xanthopeda Meyrick, 1930

References
Meyrick, E. 1930c. Microlepidoptera of Mauritius. - Transactions of the Entomological Society of London 78(2):309–323

Oecophoridae